Lyss railway station is a railway station in the municipality of Lyss, in the Swiss canton of Bern. It sits at the junction of the standard gauge Biel/Bienne–Bern, and Palézieux–Lyss lines of Swiss Federal Railways.

Services 
The following services stop at Lyss:

 Bern S-Bahn:
 : rush-hour service between Biel/Bienn and Belp.

References

External links 
 
 

Railway stations in the canton of Bern
Swiss Federal Railways stations